5-Hydroxymaltol, a derivative of maltol, is a substance that can be found in Penicillium echinulatum. It is also found in toasted oak and also in honeys from blue gum (Eucalyptus leucoxylon) and yellow box (Eucalyptus melliodora).

References

4-Pyrones
Enols
Secondary alcohols